Dolichophorus is a genus of flies in the family Dolichopodidae. A 2011 phylogenetic analysis of Medetera and related genera found that Dolichophorus is closely related to the Medetera aberrans and Medetera melanesiana species groups, rendering the genus Medetera paraphyletic.

Species
Dolichophorus caucasicus Grichanov, 2009
Dolichophorus friedmani Grichanov, 2009
Dolichophorus immaculatus Parent, 1944
Dolichophorus kerteszi Lichtwardt, 1902
Dolichophorus luteoscutatus (Parent, 1936)
Dolichophorus madagascariensis Grichanov, 2009

References

Dolichopodidae genera
Medeterinae